Christos Adamidis (1885–1949) was a Hellenic Army officer and pioneer of military aviation. He was one of the first Greek officers that received aviation training in France and later participated in air operations during the Balkan Wars.

Balkan Wars
Adamidis was born in Ioannina in 1885, then part of the Janina Vilayet of the Ottoman Empire. He initially became a cavalry officer in the Hellenic Army. In 1912, Adamidis was selected as one of the first three Greek officers, together with Dimitrios Kamberos and Michael Moutoussis, in order to receive aviation training in France and to man the newly established aviation branch of the Hellenic Army.

During the following Balkan Wars he was positioned in Epirus front where he performed reconnaissance and bombing missions against Ottoman positions during the battle of Bizani. These missions also included leaflet and food dropping to the population of Ioannina, the urban center of the area, who was starving due to the extended military conflicts. On that day, Adamidis landed his Farman MF.7 aircraft on the Town Hall square of the city, to the adulation of an enthusiastic crowd.

Later career
In 1927 Adamidis became commander of the air arm of the Hellenic Army. In June 1928, Adamidis together with Lt Evangelos Papadakis, flew around the Mediterranean Sea with a Breguet 19 aircraft. In 1931, when the Air Force became a separate branch of the Hellenic Armed Forces, he was appointed director of the Aeronautics Department.

Adamidis was discharged in 1935 with the rank of Major General.

References

1880s births
1949 deaths
Military personnel from Ioannina
People from Janina vilayet
Greeks from the Ottoman Empire
Hellenic Army officers
Greek aviators
Greek generals
Greek military personnel of the Balkan Wars
Hellenic Air Force officers
Emigrants from the Ottoman Empire to Greece